Roy Allen (1918–1991) was an American, born in the north Philadelphia neighborhood of Olney. He was a bomber pilot during World War II shot down over France and sent to Buchenwald concentration camp.

France and captivity 
On June 14, 1944, pilot Roy Allen and the crew of his B-17 Flying Fortress embarked on a mission over Nazi-occupied France.  Hit by flak, Roy was forced to parachute into France. Trapped behind enemy lines, he was rescued by Colette Florin, a 21-year-old schoolteacher and member of the French Resistance. He stayed with Colette for a few weeks until he was able to be moved into Paris. Once he arrived in Paris a man told him that he was taking him to another agent who would then sneak him into Spain and then on to England. The agent that was taking him to his supposed "British Agent", who went by Captain Jacques, betrayed him, turning him over to the Gestapo. He was then taken to Avenue Foch which at the time was the Gestapo headquarters for all of France. At Avenue Foch he was tortured, labelled a terrorist and denied his rights as a Prisoner of War under the terms of the Geneva Convention. He and other airmen were then taken to Fresnes Prison located in the town of Fresnes, Val-de-Marne, 7 miles south of Paris. As the front neared them, the Germans decided to ship Roy Allen and other 167 Allied airmen including Phil Lamason to Buchenwald concentration camp in Germany. They left Fresnes, traveling by train in cattle cars. The cars were designed to hold up to 40 men. The Germans loaded them with 90, forcing their passengers to stand for the duration of the trip.

Buchenwald concentration camp 

In Buchenwald, Allen suffered from extensive physical and psychological abuse. By the time he left he weighed a mere , almost  lighter than when he left for his mission back on June 14. While there, he suffered from dysentery, pneumonia and various other illnesses presented by the poor environment. The harsh treatment endured by Roy Allen and the other airmen at Buchenwald was a blatant violation of the Third Geneva Convention, which specifically prohibits the physical and mental abuse of captured service personnel, and states that they must be treated humanely. This explains the reason for the SS guards issuing the airmen with inmate uniforms with no serial numbers.

Later, Hannes Trautloft an officer from the Luftwaffe inspecting allied bomb damage came across the allied airmen prisoners. One of the prisoners who spoke fluent German, highlighted their case to the officer. Sympathetic to their plight (and also aware that Luftwaffe POWs in allied hands could suffer reprisals if he did not intervene) the German officer organized their transfer from Buchenwald to a legitimate prisoner of war camp i.e. Stalag Luft III in what is now Poland.

See also 
 F. F. E. Yeo-Thomas
 Comet line
 KLB Club
 Alfred Balachowsky

References 

Shot From the Sky, 2004 documentary. Airs on the Military History Channel periodically.

Further reading 

United States Army Air Forces bomber pilots of World War II
1918 births
1991 deaths
American torture victims
Buchenwald concentration camp survivors
Shot-down aviators
American prisoners of war in World War II
World War II prisoners of war held by Germany